Debbie-Ann Lewis (born 7 August 1969) is a Grenadian former cricketer who played as an all-rounder, bowling right-arm medium and batting right-handed. She appeared in 42 One Day Internationals and 5 Twenty20 Internationals for the West Indies between 2003 and 2009. She played domestic cricket for Grenada.

References

External links
 
 

1969 births
Living people
West Indian women cricketers
West Indies women One Day International cricketers
West Indies women Twenty20 International cricketers
Grenadian women cricketers